Verulam may refer to:

People
 Baron Verulam
 Earl of Verulam

Places
 Verulam, KwaZulu-Natal
 Verulam Township, Ontario
 Common abbreviation of Verulamium, third-largest city in Roman Britain, near modern-day St Albans

Other
 Radio Verulam, a community radio station in West Hertfordshire
 HMS Verulam (ship)
 Verulam School, state secondary school in St Albans, England

See also
 Verulamium